Emil Bitsch (14 June 1916 – 15 March 1944) was a Luftwaffe flying ace of World War II. He was one of the most successful pilots on the Eastern Front; being credited with 108 aerial victories. He claimed 104 over the Eastern Front and four four-engine bombers over the Western Front. He may have been the pilot that shot down Soviet female ace Yekaterina Budanova. Bitsch was killed in action against United States Army Air Forces (USAAF) fighters on 15 March 1944.

World War II
World War II in Europe had begun on Friday 1 September 1939 when German forces invaded Poland. In July 1941, Bitsch served with III. Gruppe (3rd group) of Jagdgeschwader 3 (JG 3–3rd Fighter Wing), based on the Eastern Front and under the command of Walter Oesau. The Wehrmacht had launched Operation Barbarossa, the invasion of the Soviet Union, on 22 June 1941. III. Gruppe supported Army Group South in its strategic goal towards the heavily populated and agricultural heartland of Ukraine, taking Kiev before continuing eastward over the steppes of southern USSR to the Volga with the aim of controlling the oil-rich Caucasus.

Operating from an airfield at Lutsk, Bitsch claimed his first victory on 2 July over an Ilyushin Il-2. He had a total of five victories by the end of the year. He claimed two Russian Yak-4 twin-engine fighters which were shot down on 24 June 1942 to claim his 9th and 10th victories. In July, he claimed 15 victories, including his 20th 'kill' which he shot down on 13 July. Bitsch recorded 18 victories in August, including his 30th victim shot down on 16 August; his score had risen to 40 on 28 August.

On 4 September 1942, Oberleutnant Bitsch was shot down by anti aircraft artillery northwest of Stalingrad. He bailed out of his Messerschmitt Bf 109 F-4 (Werknummer 13325—factory number) and landed safely but suffered light injuries in the incident. He later returned to combat duty and continued flying. Bitsch recorded his 50th victory on 19 March 1943 three km South of Stary. On 1 June 1943, Bitsch succeeded Oberleunant Franz Beyer who was transferred to IV. Gruppe as Staffelkapitän (squadron leader) of 8./JG 3. In July, Oberleutnant Bitsch claimed 29 aerial victories. On 5 July, he became an "ace-in-a-day". On 19 July he shot a Yakovlev Yak-1 down on the Mius front, possibly flown by Soviet female ace Yekaterina Budanova. He recorded his 100th victory on 21 July 1943 over a Lavochkin La-5. He was the 46th Luftwaffe pilot to achieve the century mark. III. Gruppe flew its last combat missions on the Eastern Front on 1 August 1943. The next day, the Gruppe was ordered to Tschassof-Jar and then back to Germany where it was based at Münster-Handorf Airfield.

Defense of the Reich and death

III. Gruppe arrived in Münster-Handorf on 3 August where it was placed under the command of Major Walther Dahl. Dahl had been appointed Gruppenkommandeur (group commander) on 20 July 1943. The Gruppe immediately began preparations for Defense of the Reich missions and was subordinated to Fighter Leader for the Holland area. Bitsch was awarded the Knight's Cross of the Iron Cross on 29 August after 104 victories claimed on the Eastern Front. On 25 August, III. Gruppe was ordered to relocate to Bad Wörishofen in southern Germany. On 1 October, the United States Army Air Forces (USAAF) attacked German aircraft production, approaching from the south, targeting the Wiener Neustadt Flugzeugwerke (WNF) in Wiener Neustadt and other targets at Friedrichshafen. At 12:30, III. Gruppe was scrambled. Approximately one hour later, the Gruppe intercepted the flight of 50 to 60 Consolidated B-24 Liberator bombers and 25 Boeing B-17 Flying Fortress bombers. In aerial combat which in parts was fought in Swiss airspace, III. Gruppe, without loss, claimed four aerial victories and three Herausschüsse (separation shots–a severely damaged heavy bomber forced to separate from its combat box and which the Luftwaffe counted as an aerial victory). In this engagement, Bitsch claimed the destruction of a B-17 which was shot down at 13:44.

On 14 October, the USAAF Eighth Air Force (USAAF) launched the second Schweinfurt raid, attacking the vital ball bearing factories at Schweinfurt. In total, 291 B-17s from the 1st and 3rd Air Division, escorted by two fighter groups, were sent on the mission. The USAAF suffered heavy losses that day. III. Gruppe claimed eighteen aerial victories and Herausschüsse that day. A B-17 destroyed at 14:45 was credited to Bitsch. On 19 December, the Fifteenth Air Force targeted the railroad transportation infrastructure at Insbruck as well as Messerschmitt aircraft manufacturing sites at Augsburg. III. Gruppe intercepted the bombers near Insbruck and claimed eight aerial victories, among them, a B-17 shot down by Bitsch.

Because the weather conditions at Bad Wörishofen rendered the airfield unserviceable, III. Gruppe was ordered to relocate to Leipheim on 18 February 1944. Bitsch claimed his 108th and last aerial victory on 23 February during the USAAF "Big Week" operation. On 15 March 1944, 344 heavy bombers of 2nd and 3rd Air Division, escorted by 588 fighter aircraft, attacked German aircraft manufacturing at Braunschweig. At 10:57, 20 aircraft from III. Gruppe took off at Leipheim and were initially ordered to Wiesbaden-Erbenheim. While the flight was still airborne, the Gruppe received further instructions and were vectored to intercept the USAAF bombers on their return from the target area. In the vicinity of Volkel in North Brabant, Netherlands, III. Gruppe came under attack of approximately 20 to 30 Republic P-47 Thunderbolt fighters. In this engagement, III. Gruppe lost six Messerschmitt Bf 109 G-6 fighters for one aerial victory claimed.

Post-war

Bitsch is buried at the German war cemetery at Ysselsteyn (in the Netherlands). The crash site was rediscovered in 1994 by Thijs Hellings, a researcher of the World War II airwar from Schijndel. With help from the landowner, remains of the plane were recovered including the radio, armored glass, the compass and many other small items.

Summary of career

Aerial victory claims
According to US historian David T. Zabecki, Bitsch was credited with 108 aerial victories. Mathews and Foreman, authors of Luftwaffe Aces – Biographies and Victory Claims, researched the German Federal Archives and found records for 106 aerial victory claims. This figure includes 105 aerial victories on the Eastern Front and one four-engined bomber on the Western Front.

Victory claims were logged to a map-reference (PQ = Planquadrat), for example "PQ 34 Ost 7546". These sectors were then subdivided into 36 smaller units to give a location area 3 × 4 km in size.

Awards
 Iron Cross (1939) 2nd and 1st Class
 Honor Goblet of the Luftwaffe on 31 August 1942 as Leutnant and pilot
 German Cross in Gold on 19 October 1942 as a Leutnant in the I./Jagdgeschwader 3
 Knight's Cross of the Iron Cross on 29 August 1943 as an Oberleutnant (war officer) and Staffelkapitän of the 8./Jagdgeschwader 3 "Udet"

Notes

References

Citations

Bibliography

 
 
 
 
 
 
 
 
 
 
 
 
 
 
 
 
 
 
 

1916 births
1944 deaths
Luftwaffe pilots
German World War II flying aces
Luftwaffe personnel killed in World War II
Recipients of the Gold German Cross
Recipients of the Knight's Cross of the Iron Cross
Burials at Ysselsteyn German war cemetery
Military personnel from Baden-Württemberg
People from Baden